EAA AirVenture Oshkosh (formerly the EAA Annual Convention and Fly-In), or just Oshkosh, is an annual air show and gathering of aviation enthusiasts held each summer at Wittman Regional Airport and adjacent Pioneer Airport in Oshkosh, Wisconsin, United States. The southern part of the show grounds, as well as Camp Scholler, are located in the town of Nekimi and a base for seaplanes on Lake Winnebago is in Black Wolf.

The airshow is arranged by the Experimental Aircraft Association (EAA), an international general aviation organization based in Oshkosh, and is the largest of its kind in the world. The show lasts a week, usually beginning on the Monday of the last full week in July. During the gathering, the airport's control tower, frequency 118.5, is the busiest in the world.

History 

EAA was founded in Hales Corners, Wisconsin in 1953 by aircraft designer and military aviator veteran Paul Poberezny, who originally started the organization in the basement of his home for builders and restorers of recreational aircraft. Although homebuilding is still a large part of the organization's activities, it has grown to include almost every aspect of recreational, commercial and military aviation, as well as aeronautics and astronautics. The first EAA fly-in was held in September 1953 at what is now Timmerman Field as a small part of the Milwaukee Air Pageant, fewer than 150 people registered as visitors the first year and only a handful of airplanes attended the event. In 1959, the EAA fly-in grew too large for the Air Pageant and moved to Rockford, Illinois. In 1970, when it outgrew its facilities at the Rockford airport (now Chicago Rockford International Airport), it moved to Oshkosh, Wisconsin. Much of the convention's growth and prominence on the world stage is credited to founder Paul Poberezny's son, aerobatic world champion and longtime EAA president Tom Poberezny, who became chairman of the event in 1977.

For many years, its official name was The EAA Annual Convention and Fly-In. In 1998, the name was changed to AirVenture Oshkosh, but many regular attendees still call it as The Oshkosh Airshow or just Oshkosh. For many years, access to the flight line was restricted to EAA members. In 1997, the fee structure for the show was changed allowing all visitors access to the entire grounds. EAA AirVenture holds nearly 1,000 forums and workshops, in addition to their many vendors which bring a variety of aircraft supplies, general merchandise, and name brand sponsors such as Piper, Cessna, Cirrus, and many others. 

The 2020 AirVenture convention and air show was canceled due to the COVID-19 pandemic.

Historical aircraft debuts

AirVenture has hosted the debut of numerous revolutionary designs. Richard VanGrunsven debuted his Van's RV-3 at the 1972 AirVenture Oshkosh, a homebuilt that defined new ways of aircraft performance. VanGrunsven would eventually go on to build more homebuilts than anyone else in the world, exceeding the annual production of all commercial general aviation companies combined. In 1975, aircraft designer Burt Rutan introduced his VariEze canard aircraft at Oshkosh, pioneering the use of moldless glass-reinforced plastic construction in homebuilts, a technique that several aircraft went on to adopt in the ensuing years including composite commercial airliners. At the 1987 AirVenture, Cirrus Aircraft's founders, the Klapmeier brothers, unveiled the Cirrus VK-30 kit aircraft, which later led to the creation of the successful SR20 and SR22, the first designs to incorporate all-composite fiberglass construction, glass-panel cockpits and airframe ballistic parachutes for use in manufactured light aircraft.

Other past notable designs introduced at AirVenture include Frank Christensen's Christen Eagle II aerobatic kit biplane in 1978, Tom Hamilton's Glasair 1 in 1980, and Lance Neibauer's Lancair 200 in 1985.

Attendance

The EAA estimated the attendance in 2021 at 608,000 people. In 2018, 2,714 international visitors registered from 87 nations. There were approximately 10,000 aircraft, 2,979 show planes, and  976 media representatives on-site from six continents, along with 867 commercial exhibitors.

In the past, attendance at the event was tabulated on a daily basis rather than on an individual basis. It is unclear whether this practice still exists at EAA Airventure. For example, in 2006 the Oshkosh Northwestern reported that attendance was estimated at 625,000 by the EAA. The estimate was for total attendees each day, so one person attending 7 days would count as 7 attendees. The paper estimated that between 200,000 and 300,000 individuals attended the event.

The large number of aircraft arrivals and departures during the fly-in week makes the Wittman Field FAA control tower the busiest in the world for that week in number of movements. To accommodate the huge flow of aircraft around the airport and the nearby airspace, a special NOTAM is published each year, choreographing the normal and emergency procedures to follow. More than 4,000 volunteers contribute approximately 250,000 hours before, during and after the event.

Economic impact
The EAA AirVenture fly-in has a large economic impact on the Oshkosh area as well as the state of Wisconsin. In 1982, the Milwaukee Journal Sentinel reported that the fly-in had a large economic benefit to the Fox Valley region. At the time EAA estimated the benefit to be around $30 million ($ in ) and the Oshkosh Convention and Tourism bureau estimated it to be lower, at $21 million ($ in ). In 1989, the Oshkosh Chamber of Commerce said that Winnebago County had a $47 million benefit from the fly in. Additionally, a 1987 UW-Oshkosh study reported a $65 million ($ in ) benefit to the entire state of Wisconsin.

In 2008, a UW-Oshkosh Center for Community Partnerships study showed a $110 million economic impact for the Oshkosh area. Of that, $84 million was direct impact with a $26 million multiplier from secondary spending. Additionally, the fly in provided 1,700 jobs and $39 million in labor income for Winnebago, Outagamie, and Fond du Lac counties. In 2017, it was estimated that the event had an over $170 million economic impact on the surrounding area.

Air-traffic operation

In 1961, The Rockford EAA airshow had 10,000 aircraft movements. In 1971, the EAA airshow at Oshkosh brought in 600 planes and 31,653 movements. Today AirVenture brings in more than 10,000 airplanes. Special air traffic procedures are used to ensure safe, coordinated operations. For example, in 2014 the special flight procedures NOTAM was 32 pages long.

FAA air traffic staff, including controllers, supervisors, and managers, compete throughout the FAA's 17-state Central Terminal Service Area to work the event. In 2008, 172 air traffic professionals representing 56 facilities volunteered to staff the facilities at Oshkosh (OSH), Fond du Lac (FLD), and Fisk. They wear bright pink shirts to stand out in the crowd.

Due to the budget sequestration in 2013, the Federal Aviation Administration announced that it was not able to send resources to support the AirVenture. Rather than cancelling the event, the Experimental Aircraft Association was forced to sign a $447,000 contract to repay the government for FAA resources during the AirVenture. EAA filed a petition in Federal court arguing that the FAA could not withhold services without specific Congressional action. However, in March 2014 EAA signed a settlement agreement agreeing to pay the 2013 costs and a further agreement that guaranteed FAA participation for another nine years. The agreement required the association to reimburse the government for AirVenture specific costs that had been provided at government expense in the years prior to 2013.

Host airports
 Wittman Regional Airport (OSH): Airplanes
 Pioneer Airport (WS17): Helicopters and airships
Ultralight Fun Fly Zone: Ultralights, powered parachutes, weight shift trikes, gyroplanes, homebuilt rotorcraft, and hot air balloons 
 Vette/Blust Seaplane Base (96WI): Seaplanes
 Fond du Lac County Airport (FLD): Diversion airport, additional parking
 Appleton International Airport (ATW): Diversion airport, additional parking, U.S. Customs and Border Protection processing
 Planeacres Airport (2WN7): Emergency diversion airport (Fisk approach)

Technical operations
Several days prior to the event, members of the FAA's Technical Operation team from around the Central Service Area arrive in Oshkosh to set up the temporary communication facilities (mobile communication platforms, Fisk VFR approach control and Fond du Lac (FLD) tower). These technicians maintain the facilities during the event and tear down and store the equipment after AirVenture ends.

Volunteering
EAA AirVenture relies heavily on volunteers who arrive in the weeks leading up to the air show. The tasks they perform range from parking cars and airplanes, to painting buildings, to helping set up and tear down concerts and shows presented by the EAA. Long-time volunteers receive free meals, tee-shirts, embroidered patches, and free admission into the EAA AirVenture event.

National Blue Beret

National Blue Beret (NBB) is a National Cadet Special Activity in the Civil Air Patrol. The event is two weeks long and is set up so that the second week will overlap with the AirVenture airshow. Participants are Civil Air Patrol cadet and senior members who must go through a competitive selection process in order to attend the event. Participants help conduct event operations, including flight marshaling, crowd control, and emergency services.

See also 

 EAA Aviation Museum
 EAA Biplane
 Jack Pelton
 Project Schoolflight
 Sport Aviation magazine
 Steve Wittman
 Sun 'n Fun
 Tannkosh
 Young Eagles

References

Further reading
 Povletich, William. "The Little Fly-in That Could: How Oshkosh Landed the Largest Annual Aviation Event in the World". Wisconsin Magazine of History, vol. 105, no. 4 (Summer 2022), pp. 24-37.

External links 

 EAA AirVenture Oshkosh
 Experimental Aircraft Association
 "#OSH18 - EAA AirVenture at Oshkosh 2018" (YouTube video) - overview shows the scale of the event and a variety of aircraft & places

Air shows in the United States
Wisconsin culture
Oshkosh, Wisconsin
Tourist attractions in Winnebago County, Wisconsin
Recurring events established in 1953
Experimental Aircraft Association
Aviation in Wisconsin
Events in Wisconsin
Summer events in the United States
1953 establishments in Wisconsin